"April Fool" is the second single from Canadian band Chalk Circle and the first from their debut EP, The Great Lake.

The single was available on 7" and 12" singles. The 12" featured two remixes of the A-side as well as a remix of third single "Me, myself & I", which are still unavailable on CD.

Track listing

7": Duke Street / DSR 71024 (Canada)

Track listing

12": Duke Street / DSR 12024 (Canada)

Track listing

Credits

Personnel
Chris Tait - vocals, guitars
Brad Hopkins - bass guitars
Derrick Murphy - drums
Tad Winklarz - keyboards, saxophone
Patrick Miles - Lead guitars, acoustic guitar

Production
Chris Wardman - producer, arranger
Ron Searles - engineer
Paul Lachapelle - engineer
Howie Weinberg - mastering as Masterdisk, New York City

1986 singles
Chalk Circle (Canadian band) songs
1986 songs